The 2018 wildfire season involves wildfires on multiple continents. An extremely rare event occurred when wildfires broke out north of the Arctic Circle in Scandinavia, with one burning on the Russia–Finland border near the Barents Sea on July 20. By the end of the calendar year, the fires in British Columbia had burned more area than in any prior recorded year; and California experienced the single largest (by area) fire on record, and a fire destroyed more structures than in any other in modern history. Similarly, the UK saw the most wildfires ever recorded in a single year, at 76, while Greece saw the deadliest wildfires in its history, with 102 casualties.

List of wildfires
Events during the season include the following:

 Americas

A U.S. national state of emergency was declared on July 28 due to the California fires, which had killed at least six people. In August, the Mendocino Complex Fire became the second largest fire in California history and the Mendocino Complex Fire became the state's largest.

Fires in British Columbia were the second worst in the history of the province, with over  burned.
2018 British Columbia wildfires
2018 California wildfires
2018 Montana wildfires
2018 Nevada wildfires
2018 Oregon wildfires
2018 Utah wildfires
2018 Washington wildfires

 Asia
2018 Russian wildfires

 Europe

2018 Attica wildfires (Greece)
2018 Sweden wildfires
2018 United Kingdom wildfires

 Oceania
2017–18 Australian bushfire season

References

External links

 
2018